John Ive Sulentic (born 24 December 1979) is a Canadian former professional soccer player who played as a midfielder and is the technical director for the Port Moody Soccer Club.

Early life
Sulentic attended Matthew McNair Secondary School and Edwardsville High School.

Club career
Sulentic began his professional career in 1999 with Vancouver Whitecaps.  He broke the USL assist record in his rookie year, with 19 helpers. In 2001, he became Vancouver's all-time assist leader in the post CSL era. In 2002 Sulentic had two trials with Dinamo Zagreb but could not find a place. The Whitecaps offered him a contract in 2005 to play in the USL, but he wanted more money so he moved to German third league side St. Pauli in 2005. In one year in Hamburg he played 24 games and scored two goals.

He was later re-signed by Vancouver but did not play a competitive match. In December 2007 he left Vancouver Whitecaps.

International career
Sulentic represented Canada at the 1998 CONCACAF U-19 Qualification Tournament (Canada did not qualify for the 1999 FIFA World Youth Championship). He was 24 years old when he won his first cap with Canada's senior team on 18 January 2004 in Bridgetown, a 1:0 win over Barbados and he represented Canada at the 2000 CONCACAF Men's Olympic Qualification Tournament.

His final international was a November 2005 friendly match against Luxembourg.

Coaching career
In 2009, Sulentic began his coaching career training the Under-12 Boys of Mountain WFC besides working as Head Coach at Euro Pro Football Academy. He later became the Technical Director at Port Moody Soccer Club.

Personal life
His older brother Petar is a semi-professional soccer player, who played for Croatia SC as well.

References

External links
 

1979 births
Living people
Soccer players from Vancouver
Canadian people of Croatian descent
Canadian soccer players
Canadian expatriate soccer players
Canada men's international soccer players
Canadian expatriate sportspeople in Germany
Vancouver Whitecaps (1986–2010) players
FC St. Pauli players
USL First Division players
Expatriate footballers in Germany
Canada men's youth international soccer players
Canada men's under-23 international soccer players
Association football midfielders